Penrose railway station is a station at Penrose, Auckland, on the Southern Line of the Auckland railway network, New Zealand. It has an island platform and is reached by pedestrian over bridges from Great South Road and Station Road. It still has its original wooden station building on the platform.

Penrose station is at the junction of the Onehunga Branch line with the North Auckland Line, and there is an adjacent side platform to the west for Onehunga Line services. The Onehunga Branch is single-track with no south-going junction at Penrose, and passengers transferring between Onehunga Line and Southern Line services must use the over bridge on the Station Road side to cross from one platform to the other.

In April 2011, the island platform was lengthened to accommodate longer suburban passenger trains, by raising the height of the platform around the old station building. On 28 April 2011, passenger trains began stopping under the station building shelter for the first time since 1993.

Penrose station is near Mount Smart Stadium, a major sports stadium.

Services
Auckland One Rail, on behalf of Auckland Transport, operates suburban services to Britomart, Onehunga, Papakura and Pukekohe via Ellerslie. The typical weekday off-peak timetable is:
3 tph to Britomart
3 tph to Papakura
2 tph to Onehunga
2 tph to Newmarket

Bus routes 66, 298 and 321 serve Penrose station.

On 24 June 2022, the Onehunga line was shortened to terminate at Newmarket due to a reduction of platforms at Britomart for City Rail Link construction.

See also 
 List of Auckland railway stations
 Public transport in Auckland

References 

Rail transport in Auckland
Railway stations in New Zealand
Railway stations opened in 1873
1873 establishments in New Zealand